Events of 2019 in South Korea.

Incumbents
 President: Moon Jae-in 
 Prime Minister: Lee Nak-yeon

Events 
 April 3 – 2019 South Korean by-elections
 April 11 – A court rules 7–2 that a 1953 ban on abortion must be lifted.
 July 1 – Japan announces tightening of high-tech exports to South Korea, thus begin the trade dispute between the two countries.
 August 22 – South Korea announces that it will scrap its General Security of Military Information Agreement (GSOMIA) with Japan. The agreement had been due for automatic renewal on this month.
 August 28 – South Korea's Ministry of Foreign Affairs calls in the United States ambassador to South Korea, Harry B. Harris Jr., to tone down the United States' public criticism of South Korea's decision not to renew its General Security of Military Information Agreement (GSOMIA) with Japan.
 August 29 – The United States Ambassador to South Korea, Harry B. Harris Jr., is absent from the DMZ International Forum on the Peace Economy. And a reservist soldiers' Korean Veterans Association cancels Harris Jr.'s speech for the association's event. He attends the grand opening of a Shake Shack branch in Jongno, Seoul. The first Shake Shack in South Korea was opened in the Gangnam District of Seoul on July 22, 2016.

Deaths 

 January 28 – Kim Bok-dong, South-Korean women's rights activist (b. 1926).
 April 7 – Cho Yang-ho, South Korean businessman (b. 1949).
 June 10 – Lee Hee-ho, South Korean peace activist, 15th First Lady of South Korea (b. 1922).
 June 29 – Jeon Mi-seon, South Korean actress (b. 1970).
 July 16 – Chung Doo-un, South Korean politician (b. 1957).
 July 24 – Hwang Byungsng, Korean poet
 July 24 – Nam Gi-nam, Korean film director
 August 30 – Park Taesun, South Korean writer
 September 9 – Kim Seong-hwan, South Korean artist and cartoonist, notable for having created and perpetuated the longest-running comic strip in Korea. 
 September 21 – Woo Hye-mi, Korean singer
 October 14 – Sulli, South Korean singer and actress (b. 1994)
 November 24 – Goo Hara, South Korean singer and actress (b. 1991)
 December 3 – Cha In-ha, South Korean actor (b.1992)
 December 9 – Kim Woo-jung. South Korean businessman who was the founder and chairman of the Daewoo Group
 December 14 – Koo Cha-kyung, South Korean business executive

References

 
South Korea
South Korea
Years of the 21st century in South Korea
2010s in South Korea